Jossy's Giants is a children's footballing comedy drama that ran on BBC1 between 1986 and 1987. The show's plot centred on a boys' football team, the Glipton Grasshoppers, and their enthusiastic Geordie manager Joswell 'Jossy' Blair. The show was written by darts commentator and television personality Sid Waddell, himself a native of Newcastle upon Tyne. Ten episodes were made. The producer and director Edward Pugh later became an executive producer and ran the Children's Programmes Department at BBC Manchester. The theme music was written by Mike Amatt. Football scenes were shot at a since demolished Oldham Town FC site off Middleton Road, Chadderton, exterior scenes were shot in and around Stalybridge, and the studio material was shot at BBC Oxford Road.

Stars
Many of the child actors from the series have since left acting, although Jim Barclay, who played Jossy Blair, has appeared on My Family and Blessed. Julian Walsh, who played Harvey, has appeared in Sorted and The Street. Walsh was also the face of the Warburton's Bread TV advertising campaign in 2007. Julie Foy, who played Tracey Gaunt, went on to appear in Press Gang and Coronation Street and acted on stage and in film. In 2017 Julie was Assistant Producer on the short film The Silent Child which won Best Live Action Short Film at the Academy Awards. Suzanne Hall, who appeared in four episodes as Harvey's girlfriend Opal, went on to appear in Hollyoaks .

Cast

Releases

Jossy's Giants was released on DVD in 2018 by Simply Media.

References

External links
Jossy's Giants on IMDB

BBC Television shows
Fictional association football television series
1986 British television series debuts
1987 British television series endings
1980s British children's television series